Alpo Luostarinen (4 June 1886, Enonkoski – 27 April 1948) was a Finnish farmer and politician. He served as a Member of the Parliament of Finland, representing the National Progressive Party from 1922 to 1927 and the Agrarian League from 1930 to 1936.

References

1886 births
1948 deaths
People from Enonkoski
People from Mikkeli Province (Grand Duchy of Finland)
National Progressive Party (Finland) politicians
Centre Party (Finland) politicians
Members of the Parliament of Finland (1922–24)
Members of the Parliament of Finland (1924–27)
Members of the Parliament of Finland (1930–33)
Members of the Parliament of Finland (1933–36)